Events from the year 1690 in France

Incumbents
 Monarch – Louis XIV

Events
1 July – Battle of Fleurus
10 July – Battle of Beachy Head
18 August – Battle of Staffarda

Births

Full date missing
François Colin de Blamont, violinist and composer (died 1760)

Deaths

22 February – Charles Le Brun, painter (born 1619)
20 April – Duchess Maria Anna Victoria of Bavaria (born 1660)
3 November – Jean-Baptiste Colbert, Marquis de Seignelay, politician (born 1651)
17 November – Charles de Sainte-Maure, duc de Montausier, governor (born 1610)

Full date missing
François Bailly, architect (born 1630?)
Margaret Mary Alacoque, Roman Catholic nun and mystic (born 1647)
Louis-François de la Baume de Suze, bishop (born 1595)

See also

References

1690s in France